The Seitz is the unofficial state soil of Colorado.

Profile
The Seitz soil series consists of very deep, well drained, slowly permeable soils that formed in colluvium or slope alluvium derived from igneous, sedimentary, and volcanic rocks. Seitz soils are located on mountains, mainly in southwestern and central Colorado. These soils are well suited to outdoor recreation and the growth of forest-related products in moderately steep or more gently sloping areas.

Plant habitat
The plant life that grows on the Seitz soil consists of an Engelmann spruce/subalpine fir or Rocky Mountain Douglas-fir canopy with a sparse understory of grasses, forbs, and shrubs.

See also
Pedology (soil study)
Soil types
List of U.S. state soils

External links
Colorado State soil

Pedology
Soil in the United States
Geology of Colorado
Symbols of Colorado
Types of soil